Fight Night Re-Loaded is a weekly UK television programme showing recorded highlights of classic UK professional boxing matches from the 1980s & 1990s.  The programme was devised by Paul Baxendale-Walker and is partnership with boxing promoter Frank Maloney.  The show was launched in December 2012, and is broadcast via the Sky satellite platform Channel 200 and online.  Broadcasts are weekly at 11pm on Mondays.

References 

2010s British television series